The following is a list of heads of government of the sixteen states of Germany.

Current Deputy Minister Presidents

See also 
 List of chancellors of Germany
 Cabinet of Germany

Notes 

Lists of political office-holders in Germany